Sanath is a Sinhalese masculine given name:

Sanath Jayasuriya, Sri Lankan cricketer.
Sanath Kaluperuma, Sri Lankan cricketer.
Sanath Ranjan, Sri Lankan cricketer.
Sanath de Silva, Sri Lankan cricketer.
Sanath Fernando, Sri Lankan former cricketer.
Sanath Kumar, Sri Lankan former cricketer.
Sanath Nandasiri, Sri Lankan musician.
Sanath Lamabathusooriya, Sri Lankan professor.
Sanath Weerakoon, Sri Lankan government official.
Sanath Nishantha, Sri Lankan politician.
Sanath Gunathilake, Sri Lankan film actor and film director.
Sanath Wimalasiri, Sri Lankan actor.

Sinhalese masculine given names